Parelheiros may refer to:

 Subprefecture of Parelheiros, São Paulo, one of 31 subprefectures of the city of São Paulo, Brazil
 Parelheiros (district of São Paulo), one of 2 districts within the subprefecture